The black-capped becard (Pachyramphus marginatus) is a species of bird in the family Tityridae. It has traditionally been placed in Cotingidae or Tyrannidae, but evidence strongly suggest it is better placed in Tityridae, where it is now placed by the South American Classification Committee.
It is found in Bolivia, Brazil, Colombia, Ecuador, French Guiana, Guyana, Peru, Suriname, and Venezuela.
Its natural habitat is subtropical or tropical moist lowland forest.

References

black-capped becard
Birds of the Amazon Basin
Birds of the Guianas
Birds of the Atlantic Forest
black-capped becard
Birds of Brazil
Taxonomy articles created by Polbot